
Gmina Michałów is a rural gmina (administrative district) in Pińczów County, Świętokrzyskie Voivodeship, in south-central Poland.

The gmina contains parts of the protected areas called Kozubów Landscape Park and Nida Landscape Park.

Villages
Gmina Michałów contains the villages and settlements of Góry, Jelcza Mała, Jelcza Wielka, Karolów, Kołków, Michałów, Pawłowice, Polichno, Przecławka, Sadkówka, Sędowice, Tomaszów, Tur Dolny, Tur Górny, Tur-Piaski, Węchadłów, Wrocieryż, Zagajów, Zagajówek and Zawale Niegosławskie.

Neighbouring gminas
Gmina Michałów is bordered by the gminas of Działoszyce, Imielno, Pińczów and Wodzisław.

Michalow
Pińczów County